Lenzini is a surname. Notable people with the surname include:

John J. Lenzini Jr. (1947–1996), American horse trainer 
Luigi Lenzini (1881–1945), Italian Roman Catholic priest
Martina Lenzini (born 1998), Italian footballer

See also
Lanzini